Woman Lake is a  lake in Cass County, Minnesota, United States.

The lake has 3 public accesses. The lake is part of a 4 lake chain called the Woman Lake Chain. Other lakes in the chain include Child Lake, Girl Lake and Little Woman Lake. The town of Longville, Minnesota can be accessed by boat from Woman Lake. The lake is very well known for its impressive Walleye, Northern, Perch, Smallmouth Bass and Muskie fishing.

The lake is stocked by the Minnesota Department of Natural Resources.

In the game NASCAR: Dirt To Dayton, one of the sponsors for the truck racing series is called Schneider Boats. The address on the letter you receive from them is Woman Lake MN. It is a fictional company, one of many Minnesota references in the game.

Woman Lake was named in commemoration of Ojibwe women who were killed there in a battle against the Sioux.

Fishing 
Woman lake has always been known for its Walleye fishing. The lake also has a very good population of Yellow perch, Northern pike, Largemouth bass and Smallmouth bass, Bluegill, Crappie, and Muskellunge. The lake has excellent water clarity, which makes fishing for the light sensitive walleye difficult during the daytime. The lake is infested with the non-native exotic Rusty crayfish.

References

External links
 

Lakes of Cass County, Minnesota
Lakes of Minnesota
Tourist attractions in Cass County, Minnesota